The twelfth season of The Bachelorette premiered on ABC on May 23, 2016. This season featured 25-year-old Joelle "JoJo" Fletcher, a real estate developer from Dallas, Texas. Fletcher was the runner-up on season of The Bachelor featuring Ben Higgins. 

The season concluded on August 1, 2016, with Fletcher accepting a proposal from 27-year-old former pro quarterback Jordan Rodgers. Rodgers and Fletcher married on May 14, 2022, and currently live in Dallas.

Contestant Chad Johnson, who was eliminated in Week 4, achieved some level of infamy in 2020 due to his arrest for domestic violence and the launch of a career in pornography.

Production

Casting and contestants
Casting began during season eleven of The Bachelorette. Days before the official announcement, second runner-up Caila Quinn was originally selected to be in the lead role, but she was dropped at the last minute and Fletcher was then named during the After the Final Rose special on the twentieth season of The Bachelor on March 14, 2016 by the producers in response to her popularity on the show. Quinn eventually went on to compete in season 3 of Bachelor in Paradise.

Notable contestant includes former American football quarterback Jordan Rodgers, the younger brother of Green Bay Packers quarterback Aaron Rodgers.

Filming and development
Filming commenced on March 16, 2016 shortly after the twentieth season of The Bachelor. Destinations including Pittsburgh in Pennsylvania, Uruguay, Thailand, and Argentina with appearances from Dan + Shay, All-4-One, Max Kellerman and Marcellus Wiley.

Contestants

The season began with 25 contestants.

Future appearances

Bachelor in Paradise
Season 3

Christian Bishop, Chad Johnson, Daniel Maguire, Evan Bass, Grant Kemp, Vinny Ventiera, and Wells Adams returned for the third season of Bachelor in Paradise. Johnson was removed from the show by Chris Harrison during week 1 for aggressive behavior towards everyone. Bishop was eliminated during week 2 and Maguire during week 4. Ventiera quit the show during week 4. Adams split from his partner, Ashley Iaconetti, during week 6. Bass and Kemp ended the season engaged to their partners, Carly Waddell and Lace Morris, respectively. However, Grant split from his fiancé post-show. Evan and Carly were married during the fourth season of Bachelor in Paradise. They broke up in December 2020.

Season 4

Ventiera, Maguire, Nick Benvenutti, Alex Woytkiw, Derek Peth, and Robby Hayes returned for the fourth season of Bachelor in Paradise. Evan and Carly were married during the season premiere. Adams returned as the hotel bartender. Woytkiw, Benvenutti, and Ventiera were eliminated during week 1. Hayes split from his partner, Amanda Stanton, during week 4. Maguire left Paradise in a relationship with his partner, Lacey Mark, but it was revealed on the reunion special that they had split shortly afterwards. Peth left Paradise in a relationship with his partner, Taylor Nolan, and the two were engaged during the reunion special, however the two split post-show.

Season 5

Hayes returned for the fifth season of Bachelor in Paradise. Hayes split from his partner, Shushanna Mkrtychyan, during week 6.

Season 6

Peth returned for the sixth season of Bachelor in Paradise, along with Chase McNary. Peth quit during week 4. McNary split from his partner, Angela Amezcua, during week 6.

Australia season 1

Kemp and Maguire appeared on the first season of the Australian version of Bachelor in Paradise. Both arrived during the 3rd week, with Maguire being eliminated at the following rose ceremony. Kemp coupled up with Ali Oetjen and at the end of the show, they agreed to pursue a relationship. They broke up before the airing of the show.

Australia season 2

Maguire returned to the Australian version of Paradise for its second season. He was eliminated in week 5.

Celebrity Big Brother UK
Johnson competed on Celebrity Big Brother Season 20. After 25 days in the house, he finished in fifth place.

The Bachelor Winter Games
Luke Pell returned for The Bachelor Winter Games as a part of Team USA. He was eliminated during week 4.

The Bachelorette
Fletcher served a guest host for the sixteenth season of The Bachelorette while host Chris Harrison was away to take his son in college.

Ex on the Beach
Season 1

McNary appeared in the first season of the MTV reality series Ex on the Beach.

Season 2

Johnson appeared in the second season of the MTV reality series Ex on the Beach.

Season 4

Maguire appeared in the fourth season of the MTV reality series Ex on the Beach.

Siesta Key

Hayes appeared on the third season of the MTV series Siesta Key.

The Challenge

McNary competed on the thirty-third season of the MTV series The Challenge dubbed War of the Worlds, in which alumni from multiple reality TV shows sought to compete for a $1 million prize. He was eliminated during episode 2.

 Challenge in bold indicates that the contestant was a finalist on The Challenge.

Call-out order

 The contestant received the first impression rose
 The contestant received a rose during a date
 The contestant was eliminated
 The contestant was eliminated during a date
 The contestant was part of non-elimination bottom two
 The contestant won the competition

Episodes

References

External links

2016 American television seasons
The Bachelorette (American TV series) seasons
Television shows filmed in California
Television shows filmed in Pennsylvania
Television shows filmed in Uruguay
Television shows filmed in Argentina
Television shows filmed in Colorado
Television shows filmed in Florida
Television shows filmed in Texas
Television shows filmed in Thailand